Aija Klakocka ( Brumermane, born 17 October 1986) is a Latvian women's basketball player with the Latvia women's national basketball team. She competed with the team at the 2008 Summer Olympics and EuroBasket Women 2009.

References

External links
 
 
 
 

1986 births
Living people
Latvian women's basketball players
Olympic basketball players of Latvia
Basketball players at the 2008 Summer Olympics
Basketball players from Riga
Latvian expatriate basketball people in Poland
Latvian expatriate basketball people in France
Latvian expatriate basketball people in Hungary
Latvian expatriate basketball people in Italy
Centers (basketball)